The Locus Award for Best Science Fiction Novel is one of the annual Locus Awards presented  by the science fiction and fantasy magazine Locus.  Awards presented in a given year are for works published in the previous calendar year. The award for Best Science Fiction Novel was first presented in 1980, and is among the awards still presented. Previously, there had simply been an award for Best Novel. A similar award for Best Fantasy Novel was introduced in 1978. The Locus Awards have been described as a prestigious prize in science fiction, fantasy and horror literature.

Winners

See also
 Locus Award for Best Fantasy Novel
 Hugo Award
 Nebula Award
 BSFA Award

References

External links
 

Science Fiction Novel
American literary awards

hu:Locus-díjas sci-fi regények